Bridges Street is a 300-metre two-way street in Sheung Wan, Hong Kong.

Location
On the east, the street intersects Shing Wong Street and Staunton Street. On the west, it intersects Square Street. The west side of the street ends with a staircase which connects Tai Ping Shan Street. Therefore, to go to Hollywood Road, drivers must drive back to Aberdeen Street.

Naming
Its name comes from William Thomas Bridges, a British lawyer, Acting Attorney General and Acting Colonial Secretary, who was active in Hong Kong from 1851 to 1861. Bridges was an old friend of Sir John Bowring, the 4th Governor of Hong Kong. The law firm established by Bridges later became known as Deacons.

Landmarks 
 Bridges Street Market (No. 2). A Bauhaus style market, originally opened in 1953, and scheduled to be renovated and open in 2018 as a news museum. It was partly built on the site of the former American Congregational Mission Preaching House at which Dr. Sun Yat-sen was baptised into Christianity in 1883.
 CentreStage, a new luxury landmark apartment near Soho, Hong Kong
 Ladder Street
 King's College Old Boys' Association Primary School (No. 58).
 The Church of Christ in China China Congregational Church (No. 68).
 Chinese YMCA of Hong Kong Bridges Street Centre (No. 51). Built in 1918 in Eclectic architectural style with Chicago School influence. The architects were Shattuck and Hussey of Chicago, which specialised in YMCA building design. The premises included the first indoor swimming pool in Hong Kong and sports playground with a jogging track. It is part of the Central and Western Heritage Trail. Its central building was formerly a Grade II historic building and was listed as a Grade I historic building in 2009.
Island Christian Academy (no. 70)

References

External links

 Bridges Street on Google Map
 

Sheung Wan
Roads on Hong Kong Island